Gauern is a municipality in the district of Greiz, in Thuringia, Germany. The town has a municipal association with Wünschendorf/Elster. Gauern has a population of 118 people (Dec. 2020).

References

Municipalities in Thuringia
Greiz (district)
Duchy of Saxe-Altenburg